The Statue of Ganesha or Monolith Ganesh or Aishwarya Ganapathi is located at Avancha, Thimmajipeta, Nagarkurnool in the Indian state of Telangana. It is the tallest Ganesh statue in India. The statue depicts the Western Chalukya Empire. The statue is 7.62 meters tall – 9.144 meters including pedestal.

History 
Ancient Ganesha idol sculpted on a big granite boulder is lying in Avancha, Thimmajipet, Telangana in 12th Century by a king of western Chalukya dynasty, the idol is located in agricultural field.

Kapilavai Linga Moorthy, the monolithic idol was sculpted by king Thylapudu, ruled Avancha as its capital. King Vikramaditya of Badami kingdom, present of Gulbarga district, belonged to western Chalukya dynasty. 

The dynasty ruled Telangana region for over 200 years. Vikramaditya sons Someshwarudu and Thylapudu. The Thylapudu was made Samanta Raju to a particular province of erstwhile Kandoor as its capital. Thylapudu shifted his capital to Avancha in 1113 AD.

References 

Hindu temples in Telangana
Nagarkurnool district
Statues in India
12th-century sculptures
12th-century establishments in India
Ganesha